Arvind Netam  (born 1942) is an Indian politician. He was Minister of State for Education and Social Welfare from February 1973 to March 1977 in Indira Gandhi Cabinet and Minister of State for Agriculture from January 1993 to 1996 in P. V. Narasimha Rao Cabinet.

References

1942 births
People from Kanker district
Living people
Lok Sabha members from Chhattisgarh
India MPs 1971–1977
India MPs 1980–1984
India MPs 1984–1989
Indian National Congress politicians
National People's Party (India) politicians
Lok Sabha members from Madhya Pradesh
India MPs 1989–1991
India MPs 1991–1996
Indian National Congress politicians from Chhattisgarh
Bahujan Samaj Party politicians